is a Japanese voice actress from Miyagi Prefecture. She is affiliated with Aoni Production. Her major roles include Yumi Mamiya in Onmyō Taisenki, Shirayuki-hime in Fairy Musketeers, and Itsuki in Wish Upon the Pleiades. She voices Corrine in Tales of Symphonia and Elisa Dolittle Naruse in Tokimeki Memorial 4.

Filmography

Anime

Theatrical animation

Video games

References

External links
Official agency profile 
 

Japanese video game actresses
Japanese voice actresses
Living people
1980 births
Voice actresses from Miyagi Prefecture
20th-century Japanese actresses
21st-century Japanese actresses
Aoni Production voice actors